Shaun Kirkham (born 24 July 1992) is a New Zealand rower. He came fourth at the 2015 World Rowing Championships with the men's eight, qualifying the boat for the 2016 Olympics. He came sixth with his team at the eights competition in Rio de Janeiro. He won an Olympic gold medal in the men's eights event at the 2020 Olympics.

References

1992 births
Living people
Medalists at the 2020 Summer Olympics
New Zealand male rowers
Olympic gold medalists for New Zealand in rowing
Olympic rowers of New Zealand
Rowers at the 2016 Summer Olympics
Rowers at the 2020 Summer Olympics
Sportspeople from Hamilton, New Zealand